The Asian Heritage Street Celebration is an Asian American event held in San Francisco, California. The Street Celebration is organized by the non-profit AsianWeek Foundation in cooperation with over 51 organizations in the Asian American community and is supported by community groups representing over 225,000 members. All proceeds from the celebration are donated to local and national charities.

The location of the street fair rotates each year to showcase the different Asian enclaves in San Francisco. The first celebration highlighted the Japanese community and took place in Japantown drawing 50,000 people, last year the event showcased the Chinese Community on Irving. St. and in 2007, celebrated the Filipino community in the downtown South of Market Area on Howard and 5th Streets.

External links

MySpace page

Culture of San Francisco
Asian-American culture in San Francisco
Festivals in the San Francisco Bay Area
Cultural festivals in the United States
Asian-American festivals